Boris Petrovich Podkorytov (born 3 May 1948 in Frunze, USSR) is a Soviet and Kyrgyzstani professional football player and manager.

Career
In 1969, he began his professional career for the Lokomotiv Moscow. Since 1970 until 1975 he played for the Alga Frunze as a forward or midfielder.

In 1984, he started his coaching career in Alga Frunze. Later he coached MC Oran, FC Zhetysu, Astana and Dordoi-Dynamo. In 2006, he was a coach of the Kyrgyzstan national football team.

References

External links
 
 Profile at Soccerpunter.com
 
 

1948 births
Living people
Kyrgyzstani footballers
Soviet footballers
Association football forwards
Association football midfielders
FC Lokomotiv Moscow players
FC Alga Bishkek players
Kyrgyzstani football managers
Kyrgyzstani expatriate football managers
Soviet football managers
Soviet expatriate football managers
Soviet expatriate sportspeople in Algeria
Expatriate football managers in Algeria
Expatriate football managers in Kazakhstan
FC Alga Bishkek managers
MC Oran managers
FC Zhetysu managers
FC Astana-1964 managers
FC Dordoi Bishkek managers
Kyrgyzstan national football team managers
Sportspeople from Bishkek
Kyrgyzstani people of Russian descent